is a Japanese professional sumo wrestler from Towada. He wrestles for the Isegahama stable and made his debut in September 2016 and reached the top division in July 2022. His highest rank has been maegashira 4. He has a jonokuchi, a jonidan, a makushita and a jūryō division championships. He has a special prize.

Early life and sumo beginnings 

Born in Towada, Aomori, he began wrestling in his third year of elementary school at Sanbongi Elementary School in Towada and in his sixth year, he placed in the top eight at the National Junior High School Sumo Tournament. In high school, he went on to Sanbongi Agricultural High School's Agricultural Machinery Department and while there he placed third in the individual division in the National High School Usa Tournament.  His classmates in high school included Onosho, as well as Midorifuji, whom he now wrestles in the same stable with.

Career  
In August 2020 Nishikifuji's promotion to the jūryō division was announced, coinciding with his stablemate Terunofuji winning the July 2020 tournament championship on his return to the top division.

In May 2022, Nishikifuji won the jūryō division's championship, also coinciding with his stablemate Yokozuna Terunofuji's seventh top division championship. 

Due to his jūryō championship the previous tournament, Nishikifuji was promoted to the top division, debuting in the rank of maegashira 17. He went on to get double-digit wins, finishing the basho with a 10-5 record. That same tournament he was granted a special prize, the Fighting Spirit prize, for finishing his debut in the top division with a strong winning record.

Career record

See also
Glossary of sumo terms
List of active sumo wrestlers

References

External links 

1996 births
Living people
Japanese sumo wrestlers